Robert de Craon or Robert Burgundio (died 13 January 1147) was the second Grand Master of the Knights Templar from June 1136 until his death. He was instrumental in getting papal sanction for the Templar Order, making it independent from ecclesiastical and secular authorities. Robert negotiated the expansion of the Order into the Iberian peninsula with the acquisition of castles and territory. He died on 13 January 1147 and was succeeded by Everard des Barres.

Life
Robert was the son of Renaud le Bourguignon and Ennoguen de Vitré. He was engaged to the daughter of the lord of Angoumois, but gave up his wedding and travelled to Palestine after learning of the foundation of the Templar Order by Hughes de Payens. He soon showed his military valour and his piety, and in 1136, after the death of Hughes, he was chosen as the new Grand Master. He proved to be a brilliant organizer and legislator, and turned the Order into a major force in the Crusader states. On March 29, 1139, Pope Innocent II issued the bull Omne Datum Optimum, which exempted the order from tithes and made them independent of any ecclesiastical jurisdiction. The Templars were also granted the habit of a red cross over a white tunic.

In 1143, Robert and Ramon Berenguer IV, Count of Barcelona negotiated the donation of six castles and dependent enclaves consisting of Monzon, Mongay, Chalamera, Barbara, Belchite, and Remolins. He participated in the Council of Acre during the Second Crusade on 24 June 1148. Robert died on 13 January 1149, and was succeeded by Everard des Barres in April that year.

Notes

References

Sources

Craon family
1147 deaths
Grand Masters of the Knights Templar
Christians of the Second Crusade
12th-century French people
Year of birth unknown